Marsilea minuta, or dwarf waterclover is a species of aquatic fern in the family Marsileaceae. It is not to be confused with Marsilea minuta E.Fourn. 1880, which is a synonym for Marsilea vestita.  Other common names include gelid waterklawer, small water clover, airy pepperwort, and pepperwort, though the lattermost also applies to plants in the genus Lepidium.  In French it is called
The Koch Rajbongshi people and Garo people call it . 
It is called '' ('shushni shak') in Bengali.

Description
M. minuta has a strongly variable appearance, which often leads to confusion with closely related species.  In the water the plant is creeping and spreading, while on land it can appear cushion-like.  It typically is perennial but sometimes appears annual.  It is a tenagophyte, with the juvenile growing submerged and the adult typically terrestrial.

The leaves in water are typically not floating, but emergent from the water. Fertile leaves are produced on land with up to four sporocarps each at penduncles near the base of the petiole. The sporocarp has a superior tooth at the apex of the stalk and an inferior tooth at the base. Unlike a few Marsilea species, M. minuta sporocarps mature above ground.

Taxonomy
M. minuta is thought to be closely related to Marsilea quadrifolia.  Molecular phylogenetic analysis of the genus Marsilea puts both in a widespread Old World subgroup also called "Marsilea" along with M. angustifolia, M. drummondii, M. crenata, and M. fadeniana and indicating that M. crenata is actually a synonym of M. minuta.

Habitat and ecology
Marsilea minuta can grow from sea level up to 1,950m in elevation in ponds and other shallow water.  It can grow in fresh water or brackish water in clay or sandy soil.  The plant can develop into large colonies, and can be weedy.  Some of its preferred habitat is being lost to agriculture but as it readily grows in Paddy fields, drainage ditches, and other marginal areas its overall population is stable.  It has the potential to be invasive and dispersal through aquarium trade and other human means should be limited.

It is a native plant in the following countries:

The leaves and sporocarps of M. minuta are eaten by many waterfowl species, and the intact sporocarps pass through undigested to be spread to new areas.  Elophila responsalis also feeds on the leaves, but is not thought to do much damage to the plant.

The plant is susceptible to herbicides such as bensulfuron-methyl, cinosulfuron, 2,4-Dichlorophenoxyacetic acid, oxyfluorfen, and paraquat.  Otherwise it can tolerate high levels of organic pollution.

Uses
It is eaten in India, Sri Lanka, and in Bangladesh.  In China it is used as forage.  It has a raw protein content of 3.3%.

The plant is used traditionally in China for edema, skin injuries, snakebite, and inflammation.  In Mymensingh District it is traditionally used to treat cough, headache, hypertension, sleep disorders, and respiratory diseases.  It is combined with Nardostachys jatamansi and after development by Asima Chatterjee sold as an ayurvedic treatment for epilepsy called "Ayush-56."  However, Ayush-56 does not show encouraging results in treating the disease. It is also used as a phytoremediator of arsenic while growing with rice plants.

Gallery

References

External links
 Marsilea minuta at iNaturalist
 
 

Flora of Asia
Plants described in 1771
Least concern biota of Asia
minuta
Aquatic plants
Taxa named by Carl Linnaeus
Least concern plants